Irakli Huramovych Tsykolia (born 26 May 1987) is a Ukrainian football player of Georgian origin. He played in Georgia for FC Kolkheti-1913 Poti.

Club career
He made his professional debut for FC Dynamo-3 Kyiv in the Ukrainian Second League in the 2004–05 season. He spent most of his career in the Ukrainian second-tier Ukrainian First League.

International
He represented Ukraine at the 2004 UEFA European Under-17 Championship, in which Ukraine lost all three games.

References

External links
 

1987 births
Sportspeople from Sukhumi
Ukrainian people of Georgian descent
Georgian emigrants to Ukraine
Living people
Ukrainian footballers
Ukraine youth international footballers
Association football defenders
FC Dynamo Kyiv players
FC Dynamo-3 Kyiv players
FC CSKA Kyiv players
Kajaanin Haka players
AC Oulu players
Rovaniemen Palloseura players
TP-47 players
FC Taraz players
FC Bukovyna Chernivtsi players
FC Arsenal-Kyivshchyna Bila Tserkva players
FC Naftovyk-Ukrnafta Okhtyrka players
PFC Sumy players
FC Kolkheti-1913 Poti players
Ukrainian First League players
Veikkausliiga players
Ykkönen players
Kazakhstan Premier League players
Erovnuli Liga players
Ukrainian expatriate footballers
Expatriate footballers in Finland
Expatriate footballers in Kazakhstan
Expatriate footballers in Georgia (country)
FC Shevardeni-1906 Tbilisi players